Henry's Anger was a Canberra-based metal band, active in the 1990s. Their second album, Personality Test, was nominated for an ARIA  Award for Best Rock Album 

They supported many acts such as Deftones, Mr. Bungle, Suicidal Tendencies, Unsane, Strife, Regurgitator and The Mark of Cain.

Biography
The band was formed in 1994 and were finalists in the Australian National University's Campus Bands competition. That year it received an ACT cultural grant and released the Honest Brutality, Horrific Beauty demo tape. The demo tape was popular, selling about 350 copies by September 1995, helping them to establish a committed local following.

After the release of the Interfere EP, original guitarist Malcolm McAllister and vocalist Michael Patrick Monaghan left to join forces with previous members of the rock band "Stickman" and folk duo "Plutoastia" to create the Canberra Acid folk outfit "The Way Hip Antelopes".

Discography

Albums

Extended Plays

Awards and nominations

ARIA Music Awards
The ARIA Music Awards are a set of annual ceremonies presented by Australian Recording Industry Association (ARIA), which recognise excellence, innovation, and achievement across all genres of the music of Australia. They commenced in 1987.

! 
|-
| 1999 || Personality Test || ARIA Award for Best Rock Album||  || 
|-

References

Australian Capital Territory musical groups
Australian heavy metal musical groups